The 2010 WPS Dispersal Draft was a special draft for Women's Professional Soccer (WPS) after the Los Angeles Sol withdrew from the league. Players from the team were dispersed to the remaining seven teams in the league via the draft.

Background
When the Los Angeles Sol folded on January 28, 2010 after a potential sale of the team fell through at the last minute, WPS, which had been running the team after AEG backed out, announced that the nineteen players under contract to the Sol would be dispersed to the remaining WPS teams in a dispersal draft, held on Thursday, February 4, 2010.

Format
The draft order for the first and third rounds is Atlanta, then Philadelphia, followed by the remaining six teams in the reverse order of finish from the 2009 season; draft order for the second round is the reverse of that.

Draft Results

Round 1

Round 2

Round 3

Draft Notes
^ Via trade with Atlanta Beat (trade prior to draft). Saint Louis will send defender Kia McNeill, midfielders Angie Kerr and Amanda Poach, and Athletica’s second round choice in the dispersal draft (9th overall) to Atlanta. In exchange, Saint Louis will receive Atlanta’s first round pick, number one overall, in the dispersal draft, and Atlanta’s second round pick in the 2011 WPS Draft.

^^ Via trade with Chicago Red Stars (Chicago receives FC Gold Pride's 2nd Round pick in 2011 WPS Draft).

^^^ Via trade with Chicago Red Stars (Chicago receives Saint Louis Athletica's 2nd Round pick in 2011 WPS Draft).

See also

 List of WPS drafts
 2011 WPS season

References

External links
Full Results on Women's Professional Soccer main site

Women's Professional Soccer drafts
Draft